Pigeon River may refer to the following streams in the U.S. state of Michigan:

 Pigeon River (Huron County, Michigan), in Huron County in the Thumb of Michigan, flowing west and north into the Saginaw Bay of Lake Huron
 Pigeon River (Mullett Lake), with headwaters in Otsego County, flowing mostly northward through Montmorency and Cheboygan counties into Mullett Lake
 South Branch Pigeon River, a tributary of the Pigeon River in Otsego County
 Pigeon River (Ottawa County, Michigan), rising in Ottawa County's Olive Township, flowing east to west into Pigeon Lake and then Lake Michigan at Port Sheldon
 Pigeon River (St. Joseph River), rising in northern Indiana and flowing mostly westward through southern Michigan into the St. Joseph River near the Michigan-Indiana border northwest of Elkhart, Indiana

See also 
 Little Pigeon River (Michigan)

References 

Rivers of Michigan
Set index articles on rivers of Michigan